Norfolk Island competed at the 2018 Commonwealth Games in the Gold Coast, Australia from April 4 to April 15, 2018.

On March 18, 2018, lawn bowler Hadyn Evans was named as the nation's flag bearer at the opening ceremony.

Ryan Dixon, Hadyn Evans and Phillip Jones won the country's first Commonwealth Games medal since 1994, when they won bronze in the men's triples lawn bowls event.

Medalists

Competitors
The following is the list of number of competitors participating at the Games per sport/discipline.

Lawn bowls

Norfolk Island is scheduled to compete in the lawn bowls competition.

Men

Women

Shooting

Norfolk Island participated with 8 athletes (7 men and 1 woman).

Men

Women

References

Nations at the 2018 Commonwealth Games
Norfolk Island at the Commonwealth Games
2018 in Norfolk Island